Senossa (or Senoussa) is a village and seat of the commune of Ouro Ali in the Cercle of Djenné in the Mopti Region of southern-central Mali.

References

External links
.

Populated places in Mopti Region